The 1946 Illinois Fighting Illini football team was an American football team that represented the University of Illinois in the 1946 Big Nine Conference football season.  Led by fifth-year head coach Ray Eliot, the Illini compiled an 8–2 record (6–1 against Big Nine opponents) and won the Big Nine championship. They finished the season ranked No. 5 in the final AP Poll and were invited to play in the 1947 Rose Bowl where they defeated No. 4 UCLA, 45–14. Center Mac Wenskunas was the team captain.  

Guard Alex Agase was a consensus first-team selection on the 1946 All-America college football team. Agase also received the Chicago Tribune Silver Football as the Big Nine's most valuable player. Four Illinois players received honors from the Associated Press (AP) or United Press (UP) on the 1946 All-Big Nine Conference football team: Agase (AP-1, UP-1); ends Ike Owens (UP-1) and Sam Zatkoff (UP-2); and halfback Jules Rykovich (UP-2).

The team played its home games at Memorial Stadium in Champaign, Illinois.

Schedule

Roster

Head Coach: Ray Eliot (5th year at Illinois)

Awards and honors
 Alex Agase
 Chicago Tribune Silver Football
 Consensus All-American (guard)

References

Illinois
Illinois Fighting Illini football seasons
Big Ten Conference football champion seasons
Rose Bowl champion seasons
Illinois Fighting Illini football